not to be confused with another Polish Olympic competitor Andrzej Krzeptowski (born 1903)

Andrzej Krzeptowski (August 3, 1902 – April 12, 1981) was a Polish cross-country skier who competed in the 1928 Winter Olympics.

He was born in Kościelisko, Gmina Kościelisko and died in Zakopane.

In 1928 he finished 13th in the 50 kilometre event and 25th in the 18 kilometre competition.

External links
 Cross-country skiing 1928 

1902 births
1981 deaths
Polish male cross-country skiers
Olympic cross-country skiers of Poland
Cross-country skiers at the 1928 Winter Olympics
People from Tatra County
Sportspeople from Lesser Poland Voivodeship